Dobratsch (Slovenian: Dobrač) or the Villacher Alps (Slovenian: Beljaščica) is a mountain range in the Carinthia region of Austria. It forms the foothills of the Gailtal Alps and is immediately west of the town of Villach.

Mountains of Europe
Mountains of Carinthia (state)
Two-thousanders of Austria
Gailtal Alps
Mountains of the Alps
Villach
Landslides